H antigen can refer to one of various types of antigens having diverse biological functions. H antigen is located on the 19th chromosome in humans, and has a variety of functions and definitions as follows:
 Also known as substance H, H antigen is a precursor to each of the ABO blood group antigens, apparently present in all people except those with the Bombay Blood phenotype (see hh blood group)
 Histocompatibility antigen, a major factor in graft rejection.  Even when Major Histocompatibility Complex genotype is perfectly matched, can cause slow rejection of a graft. 
 major H antigens "encode molecules that present foreign peptides to T cells"
 minor H antigens "present polymorphic self peptides to T cells".  Includes, e.g. the H-Y antigen
 a bacterial flagellar antigen

References

Medical tests
Bacterial proteins